Fleurbaix is a locality in the Southern Downs Region, Queensland, Australia.

Geography 
The north of the locality is hilly and undeveloped; it is part of the Herries Range. The south of the locality is also hilly. The area in-between is flatter and is used for farming. A number of creeks flow through this area.

History 
The locality was established as a soldier settlement area which was named after the railway station. The name was proposed by surveyor George Grant and refers to the site of French World War I Battle of Fleurbaix which involved the 5th Australian Division on 19 July 1916.

References 

Southern Downs Region
Localities in Queensland